Ramesh Prasad is an Indian cricketer. He made his first-class debut on 12 February 2020, for Bengal in the 2019–20 Ranji Trophy.

References

External links
 

Year of birth missing (living people)
Living people
Indian cricketers
Bengal cricketers
Place of birth missing (living people)